is the title of the second single by the Hello! Project unit Buono!. The title song is used for the second ending theme of Shugo Chara!.

The single was released on February 6, 2008 in  Japan under the Pony Canyon label in regular and limited edition versions. The limited edition release, includes a DVD and trading card.

The Single V version was released on February 13, 2008 titled .

Track listing

CD 
 
 
 "Renai♥Rider (Instrumental)"
 "Janakya Mottainai! (Instrumental)"

Single V DVD

Oricon ranks and sales

Television performances 
 Haromoni@ (February 10, 2008)
 Uta Doki (February 11, 2008)
 Music Japan (February 15, 2008)

References

External links 
 "Renai♥Rider" entries on the Hello! Project official website: CD entry, DVD entry 

2008 singles
Shugo Chara!
Buono! songs
Song recordings produced by Tsunku
2008 songs
Pony Canyon singles
Song articles with missing songwriters